Sint-Jan Basket was a Belgian basketball team based in Antwerp. The team played in the Tweede Nationale, the second division in Belgium. In 2014, Sint-Jan merged with Mercurius BBC.

Notable players

 Patrick Hilliman

References

Defunct basketball teams in Belgium
Sport in Antwerp
Basketball teams disestablished in 2014